An actuary is a business professional with advanced statistical skills who deals with the measurement and management of risk and uncertainty. The name of the corresponding field is actuarial science. These risks can affect both sides of the balance sheet and require asset management, liability management, and valuation skills. Actuaries provide assessments of financial security systems, with a focus on their complexity, their mathematics, and their mechanisms.

While the concept of insurance dates to antiquity, the concepts needed to scientifically measure and mitigate risks have their origins in the 17th century studies of probability and annuities. Actuaries of the 21st century require analytical skills, business knowledge, and an understanding of human behavior and information systems to design and manage programs that control risk. The actual steps needed to become an actuary are usually country-specific; however, almost all processes share a rigorous schooling or examination structure and take many years to complete.

The profession has consistently been ranked as one of the most desirable. In various studies in the United States, being an actuary was ranked first or second multiple times since 2010 and in the top 20 for most of the past decade.

Responsibilities
Actuaries use skills primarily in mathematics, particularly calculus-based probability and mathematical statistics, but also economics, computer science, finance, and business. For this reason, actuaries are essential to the insurance and reinsurance industries, either as staff employees or as consultants; to other businesses, including sponsors of pension plans; and to government agencies such as the Government Actuary's Department in the United Kingdom or the Social Security Administration in the United States of America. Actuaries assemble and analyze data to estimate the probability and likely cost of the occurrence of an event such as death, sickness, injury, disability, or loss of property. Actuaries also address financial questions, including those involving the level of pension contributions required to produce a certain retirement income and the way in which a company should invest resources to maximize its return on investments in light of potential risk. Using their broad knowledge, actuaries help design and price insurance policies, pension plans, and other financial strategies in a manner that will help ensure that the plans are maintained on a sound financial basis.

Disciplines
Most traditional actuarial disciplines fall into two main categories: life and non-life.

Life actuaries, which include health and pension actuaries, primarily deal with mortality risk, morbidity risk, and investment risk. Products prominent in their work include life insurance, annuities, pensions, short and long term disability insurance, health insurance, health savings accounts, and long-term care insurance. In addition to these risks, social insurance programs are influenced by public opinion, politics, budget constraints, changing demographics, and other factors such as medical technology, inflation, and cost of living considerations.

Non-life actuaries, also known as property and casualty or general insurance actuaries, deal with both physical and legal risks that affect people or their property. Products prominent in their work include auto insurance, homeowners insurance, commercial property insurance, workers' compensation, malpractice insurance, product liability insurance, marine insurance, terrorism insurance, and other types of liability insurance.

Actuaries are also called upon for their expertise in enterprise risk management. This can involve dynamic financial analysis, stress testing, the formulation of corporate risk policy, and the setting up and running of corporate risk departments. Actuaries are also involved in other areas of the financial services industry, such as analyzing securities offerings or market research.

Traditional employment
On both the life and casualty sides, the classical function of actuaries is to calculate premiums and reserves for insurance policies covering various risks. On the casualty side, this analysis often involves quantifying the probability of a loss event, called the frequency, and the size of that loss event, called the severity. The amount of time that occurs before the loss event is important, as the insurer will not have to pay anything until after the event has occurred. On the life side, the analysis often involves quantifying how much a potential sum of money or a financial liability will be worth at different points in the future. Since neither of these kinds of analysis are purely deterministic processes, stochastic models are often used to determine frequency and severity distributions and the parameters of these distributions. Forecasting interest yields and currency movements also plays a role in determining future costs, especially on the life side.

Actuaries do not always attempt to predict aggregate future events. Often, their work may relate to determining the cost of financial liabilities that have already occurred, called retrospective reinsurance, or the development or re-pricing of new products.

Actuaries also design and maintain products and systems. They are involved in financial reporting of companies' assets and liabilities. They must communicate complex concepts to clients who may not share their language or depth of knowledge. Actuaries work under a code of ethics that covers their communications and work products.

Non-traditional employment
As an outgrowth of their more traditional roles, actuaries also work in the fields of risk management and enterprise risk management for both financial and non-financial corporations. Actuaries in traditional roles study and use the tools and data previously in the domain of finance. The Basel II accord for financial institutions (2004), and its analogue, the Solvency II accord for insurance companies (in force since 2016), require institutions to account for operational risk separately, and in addition to, credit, reserve, asset, and insolvency risk. Actuarial skills are well suited to this environment because of their training in analyzing various forms of risk, and judging the potential for upside gain, as well as downside loss associated with these forms of risk.

Actuaries are also involved in investment advice and asset management, and can be general business managers and chief financial officers. They analyze business prospects with their financial skills in valuing or discounting risky future cash flows, and apply their pricing expertise from insurance to other lines of business. For example, insurance securitization requires both actuarial and finance skills. Actuaries also act as expert witnesses by applying their analysis in court trials to estimate the economic value of losses such as lost profits or lost wages.

History

Need for insurance
The basic requirements of communal interests gave rise to risk sharing since the dawn of civilization. For example, people who lived their entire lives in a camp had the risk of fire, which would leave their band or family without shelter. After barter came into existence, more complex risks emerged and new forms of risk manifested. Merchants embarking on trade journeys bore the risk of losing goods entrusted to them, their own possessions, or even their lives.  Intermediaries developed to warehouse and trade goods, which exposed them to financial risk. The primary providers in extended families or households ran the risk of premature death, disability or infirmity, which could leave their dependents to starve. Credit procurement was difficult if the creditor worried about repayment in the event of the borrower's death or infirmity. Alternatively, people sometimes lived too long from a financial perspective, exhausting their savings, if any, or becoming a burden on others in the extended family or society.

Early attempts
In the ancient world there was not always room for the sick, suffering, disabled, aged, or the poor—these were often not part of the cultural consciousness of societies. Early methods of protection, aside from the normal support of the extended family, involved charity; religious organizations or neighbors would collect for the destitute and needy. By the middle of the 3rd century, charitable operations in Rome supported 1,500 suffering people. Charitable protection remains an active form of support in the modern era, but receiving charity is uncertain and often accompanied by social stigma.

Elementary mutual aid agreements and pensions did arise in antiquity. Early in the Roman empire, associations were formed to meet the expenses of burial, cremation, and monuments—precursors to burial insurance and friendly societies. A small sum was paid into a communal fund on a weekly basis, and upon the death of a member, the fund would cover the expenses of rites and burial. These societies sometimes sold shares in the building of columbāria, or burial vaults, owned by the fund. Other early examples of mutual surety and assurance pacts can be traced back to various forms of fellowship within the Saxon clans of England and their Germanic forebears, and to Celtic society.

Non-life insurance started as a hedge against loss of cargo during sea travel. Anecdotal reports of such guarantees occur in the writings of Demosthenes, who lived in the 4th century BCE. The earliest records of an official non-life insurance policy come from Sicily, where there is record of a 14th-century contract to insure a shipment of wheat. In 1350, Lenardo Cattaneo assumed "all risks from act of God, or of man, and from perils of the sea" that may occur to a shipment of wheat from Sicily to Tunis up to a maximum of 300 florins. For this he was paid a premium of 18%.

Development of theory

During the 17th century, a more scientific basis for risk management was being developed. In 1662, a London draper named John Graunt showed that there were predictable patterns of longevity and death in a defined group, or cohort, of people, despite the uncertainty about the future longevity or mortality of any one individual. This study became the basis for the original life table. Combining this idea with that of compound interest and annuity valuation, it became possible to set up an insurance scheme to provide life insurance or pensions for a group of people, and to calculate with some degree of accuracy each member's necessary contributions to a common fund, assuming a fixed rate of interest. The first person to correctly calculate these values was Edmond Halley. In his work, Halley demonstrated a method of using his life table to calculate the premium someone of a given age should pay to purchase a life-annuity.

Early actuaries
James Dodson's pioneering work on the level premium system led to the formation of the Society for Equitable Assurances on Lives and Survivorship (now commonly known as Equitable Life) in London in 1762. This was the first life insurance company to use premium rates that were calculated scientifically for long-term life policies, using Dodson's work. After Dodson's death in 1757, Edward Rowe Mores took over the leadership of the group that eventually became the Society for Equitable Assurances. It was he who specified that the chief official should be called an actuary. Previously, the use of the term had been restricted to an official who recorded the decisions, or acts, of ecclesiastical courts, in ancient times originally the secretary of the Roman senate, responsible for compiling the Acta Senatus. Other companies that did not originally use such mathematical and scientific methods most often failed or were forced to adopt the methods pioneered by Equitable.

Development of the modern profession

In the 18th and 19th centuries, computational complexity was limited to manual calculations. The actual calculations required to compute fair insurance premiums are complex. The actuaries of that time developed methods to construct easily used tables, using sophisticated approximations called commutation functions, to facilitate timely, accurate, manual calculations of premiums. Over time, actuarial organizations were founded to support and further both actuaries and actuarial science, and to protect the public interest by ensuring competency and ethical standards. Since calculations were cumbersome, actuarial shortcuts were commonplace.

Non-life actuaries followed in the footsteps of their life compatriots in the early 20th century. In the United States, the 1920 revision to workers' compensation rates took over two months of around-the-clock work by day and night teams of actuaries. In the 1930s and 1940s, rigorous mathematical foundations for stochastic processes were developed. Actuaries began to forecast losses using models of random events instead of deterministic methods. Computers further revolutionized the actuarial profession. From pencil-and-paper to punchcards to microcomputers, the modeling and forecasting ability of the actuary has grown exponentially.

Another modern development is the convergence of modern financial theory with actuarial science. In the early 20th century, actuaries were developing techniques that can be found in modern financial theory, but for various historical reasons, these developments did not achieve much recognition. In the late 1980s and early 1990s, there was a distinct effort for actuaries to combine financial theory and stochastic methods into their established models. In the 21st century, the profession, both in practice and in the educational syllabi of many actuarial organizations, combines tables, loss models, stochastic methods, and financial theory, but is still not completely aligned with modern financial economics.

Remuneration and ranking
As there are relatively few actuaries in the world compared to other professions, actuaries are in high demand, and are highly paid for the services they render. Similarly, a  survey in the United Kingdom by Hays plc indicated a starting salary for a graduate of about £35,500; actuaries with more experience can earn well in excess of £100,000.

The actuarial profession has been consistently ranked for decades as one of the most desirable. Actuaries work comparatively reasonable hours, in comfortable conditions, without the need for physical exertion that may lead to injury, are well paid, and the profession consistently has a good hiring outlook. Not only has the overall profession ranked highly, but it also is considered one of the best professions for women, and one of the best recession-proof professions. In the United States, the profession was rated as the best profession by CareerCast, which uses five key criteria to rank jobs—environment, income, employment outlook, physical demands, and stress, in 2010, 2013, and 2015. In other years, it remained in the top 20. In the United Kingdom, and around the world, actuaries continue to be highly ranked as a profession.

Credentialing and exams

Becoming a fully credentialed actuary requires passing a rigorous series of professional examinations, usually taking several years. In some countries, such as Denmark, most study takes place in a university setting. In others, such as the US, most study takes place during employment through a series of examinations. In the UK, and countries based on its process, there is a hybrid university-exam structure.

Exam support
As these qualifying exams are extremely rigorous, support is usually available to people progressing through the exams. Often, employers provide paid on-the-job study time and paid attendance at seminars designed for the exams. Also, many companies that employ actuaries have automatic pay raises or promotions when exams are passed. As a result, actuarial students have strong incentives for devoting adequate study time during off-work hours. A common rule of thumb for exam students is that, for the Society of Actuaries examinations, roughly 400 hours of study time are necessary for each four-hour exam. Thus, thousands of hours of study time should be anticipated over several years, assuming no failures.

Pass marks and pass rates
Historically, the actuarial profession has been reluctant to specify the pass marks for its examinations. To address concerns that there are pre-existing pass/fail quotas, a former Chairman of the Board of Examiners of the Institute and Faculty of Actuaries stated: "Although students find it hard to believe, the Board of Examiners does not have fail quotas to achieve. Accordingly pass rates are free to vary (and do). They are determined by the quality of the candidates sitting the examination and in particular how well prepared they are. Fitness to pass is the criterion, not whether you can achieve a mark in the top 40% of candidates sitting." In 2000, the Casualty Actuarial Society (CAS) decided to start releasing pass marks for the exams it offers. The CAS's policy is also not to grade to specific pass ratios; the CAS board affirmed in 2001 that "the CAS shall use no predetermined pass ratio as a guideline for setting the pass mark for any examination. If the CAS determines that 70% of all candidates have demonstrated sufficient grasp of the syllabus material, then those 70% should pass. Similarly, if the CAS determines that only 30% of all candidates have demonstrated sufficient grasp of the syllabus material, then only those 30% should pass."

Notable actuaries

Nathaniel Bowditch (1773–1838)
Early American mathematician remembered for his work on ocean navigation. In 1804, Bowditch became what was probably the United States of America's second insurance actuary as president of the Essex Fire and Marine Insurance Company in Salem, Massachusetts 
Harald Cramér (1893–1985)
Swedish actuary and probabilist notable for his contributions in mathematical statistics, such as the Cramér–Rao inequality. Cramér was an Honorary President of the Swedish Actuarial Society 
James Dodson (c. 1705 – 1757)
Head of the Royal Mathematical School, and Stone's School, Dodson built on the statistical mortality tables developed by Edmund Halley in 1693 
Edmond Halley (1656–1742)
While Halley actually predated much of what is now considered the start of the actuarial profession, he was the first to rigorously calculate premiums for a life insurance policy mathematically and statistically 
James C. Hickman (1927–2006)
American actuarial educator, researcher, and author 
Oswald Jacoby (1902–1984)
American actuary best known as a contract bridge player, he was the youngest person ever to pass four examinations of the Society of Actuaries 
David X. Li
Canadian qualified actuary who in the first decade of the 21st century pioneered the use of Gaussian copula models for the pricing of collateralized debt obligations (CDOs) 
Edward Rowe Mores (1731–1778)
First person to use the title 'actuary' with respect to a business position 
William Morgan (1750–1833)
Morgan was the appointed Actuary of the Society for Equitable Assurances in 1775. He expanded on Mores's and Dodson's work, and may be considered the father of the actuarial profession in that his title became applied to the field as a whole. 
Robert J. Myers (1912–2010)
American actuary who was instrumental in the creation of the U.S. Social Security program 
Frank Redington (1906–1984)
British actuary who developed the Redington Immunization Theory.
Isaac M. Rubinow (1875–1936)
Founder and first president of the Casualty Actuarial Society.
Elizur Wright (1804–1885)
American actuary and abolitionist, professor of mathematics at Western Reserve College (Ohio). He campaigned for laws that required life insurance companies to hold sufficient reserves to guarantee that policies would be paid.

Fictional actuaries

Actuaries have appeared in works of fiction including literature, theater, television, and film. At times, they have been portrayed as "math-obsessed, socially disconnected individuals with shockingly bad comb-overs", which has resulted in a mixed response amongst actuaries themselves.

Citations

Works cited 

 
 
 
 
*
 
 
 
 
 
*
 
 
 
 
 
 
 
 
 
 
 
*
 
*

 
*
 
 
 
 
*
 
  Alt URL
*
*
 
 
 
*
 
*
 
 
 
*
 
*
 
*
 
*
*
 
 
 
 
 
 
 
 
 
*
 
 
 
*
*

External links

 Be an Actuary: The SOA and CAS jointly sponsored web site

Actuarial science
Financial services occupations
Mathematical science occupations